Gabriel Novaes Fernandes (born 5 April 1999), known as Gabriel Novaes, is a Brazilian footballer who plays as a forward for Goiás, on loan from Red Bull Bragantino.

Career statistics

Club

References

External links

1999 births
Living people
Brazilian footballers
Brazil youth international footballers
Brazilian expatriate footballers
Association football forwards
Segunda División B players
Campeonato Brasileiro Série A players
Campeonato Brasileiro Série B players
São Paulo FC players
FC Barcelona players
FC Barcelona Atlètic players
Córdoba CF players
Esporte Clube Juventude players
Esporte Clube Bahia players
Red Bull Bragantino players
Brazilian expatriate sportspeople in Spain
Expatriate footballers in Spain
Footballers from São Paulo